Messias is a municipality located in the Brazilian state of Alagoas. Its population is 18,031 (2020) and its area is 113 km².

The municipality contains 1% of the  Murici Ecological Station, created in 2001.

References

Municipalities in Alagoas